Tyresövallen, previous known as Bollmoravallen, is a football stadium in Tyresö, Sweden.  The main tenants of the stadium are the football team Tyresö FF and the American football team Tyresö AFF Royal Crowns.
The stadium holds least 2,700 people.

Stands
There are two stands with seating which hold about 1,100 seats and there is a standing terrace which holds 1,600; a total of least 2,700 people.

References

External links
 Tyresövallen - at Tyreso.se webpage

Football venues in Sweden
Tyresö Municipality
Damallsvenskan stadiums
American football venues in Sweden